Vehicle Set Strategy, commonly shortened to VSS, is the name applied to a series of four automotive platforms in use by General Motors for their vehicles as part of an effort to consolidate their platform usage for the present and future. Currently, the Buick Encore GX and Chevrolet Trailblazer are the only production vehicles using these platforms, though GM eventually plans to have one of four VSS platforms underpin over 75% of their models, the only exceptions being dedicated EV platforms and the Corvette.

VSS-F 
VSS-F is to be GM's primary front-wheel drive and all-wheel drive platform, considered a successor to the Gamma, Delta, and Epsilon platforms. It is planned to underpin many subcompact to fullsize cars as well as GM's smaller crossovers in the future, a pattern established by the first models to use it, the Chevrolet Trailblazer and Buick Encore GX.

Of the four, this platform has the most developed implementation plan, with three variants already established:

 VSS-F A: for minicompact cars (i.e. Chevrolet Spark)
 VSS-F B/C: for subcompact and compact cars and crossovers (e.g. Buick Encore and Chevrolet Sonic)
 VSS-F D/E: for midsize and fullsize cars (i.e. Chevrolet Malibu and Impala)

Models 
 Buick Encore GX (2019-present)
 Buick Envista (2022-present)
 Chevrolet Trailblazer (2020-present)
 Chevrolet Seeker/Trax (from 2023)

VSS-R 
VSS-R is to be GM's sole rear-wheel drive platform, considered a successor to both the Alpha and Omega platforms. Vehicles slated to be underpinned by this platform include the second generations of the Cadillac CT4, CT5, and CT6, as well as future models of the Chevrolet Camaro.

VSS-S 
VSS-S is to be GM's secondary front-wheel drive platform, also capable of all-wheel drive. Due to this, GM intends to utilize this platform for crossovers ranging in size between compact and fullsize. Vehicles slated to be underpinned by this platform include the Buick Enclave and Chevrolet Equinox.

VSS-T 
VSS-T is to be GM's sole body-on-frame SUV and pickup truck platform, considered a successor to the long-standing GMT platform and capable of all-wheel drive. It is to be capable of supporting midsize and fullsize truck dimensions, and will underpin both the fifth generation Chevrolet Silverado/GMC Sierra and the fourth generation Chevrolet Colorado/GMC Canyon.

See also 

 General Motors, the automotive conglomerate that manufactures these platforms
 Mary Barra, CEO of GM who initiated the effort towards platform consolidation
 List of GM platforms, a list of all platforms that GM has produced

References 

VSS